The 2017 Baloncesto Superior Nacional season was the 88th season of the Baloncesto Superior Nacional (BSN).

League news
Piratas de Quebradillas claimed its 6th BSN championship on August 9. After defeating the Capitanes de Arecibo in Game 7 of the Serie Final 98–90 to the end of the 2017 season.

Leones de Ponce reported on August 24; Head coach Nelson Colón had resigned from his position as coach despite the team's absolute endorsement to continue. Throughout his 5 seasons, he led Ponce finishing among the best 4 records of the regular season in 4 of them, 3 finals, and 2 championships.

Awards

Season Awards 
On July 19, Gary Browne was named the league's Most Improved Player. Two weeks later, he was awarded the Most Valuable Player.

Most Valuable Player: Gary Browne
Rookie of the Year: 
Coach of the Year: 
Sixth Man of the Year:
Most Improved Player of the Year: Gary Browne

Teams

2017 teams

References

External links 
 Official site 

Baloncesto Superior Nacional